USS Sayonara II (SP-587) was a United States Navy patrol vessel in commission from 1917 to 1919.

Sayonara II was built as a private motorboat of the same name by George Lawley & Son at Neponset, Massachusetts, in 1916. On 25 April 1917, the U.S. Navy acquired her under a $1.00 (USD)-per-month lease from her owner, Charles Blum of New York City, for use as a section patrol boat during World War I. She was commissioned as USS Sayonara II (SP-587) on 8 May 1917 .

Assigned to the 1st Naval District in northern New England, Sayonara II carried out patrol duties there for the rest of World War I and into early 1919.

Sayonara II was decommissioned in March 1919 and returned to Blum on 10 April 1919.

References

Department of the Navy Naval History and Heritage Command Online Library of Selected Images: U.S. Navy Ships: USS Sayonara II (SP-587), 1917-1919
NavSource Online: Section Patrol Craft Photo Archive Sayonara II (SP 587)

Patrol vessels of the United States Navy
World War I patrol vessels of the United States
Ships built in Boston
1916 ships